"Let the Rhythm Pump" is a 1989 single by Doug Lazy. It was Lazy's biggest hit, spending 13 weeks on the dance play chart in the USA.

References

1989 singles
1989 songs